This list of newspapers in London is divided into papers sold throughout the region and local publications. It is further divided into paid for and free titles. The newspaper industry in England is dominated by national newspapers, all of which are edited in London, although The Guardian began as the Manchester Guardian. For a list of the national newspapers available in London see List of newspapers in the United Kingdom.

Regional

Local

Paid for

Free

Defunct

Printed papers moved online

See also 
 Media in London
Directory of London Newspapers with Logos

References 

London
 
Newspapers